The New York Stallion Series was created by the New York Thoroughbred Breeders', Inc. The races (once a day-long event but now spread out over various dates) are run at Aqueduct Racetrack and/or Belmont Park and feature the progeny of stallions standing in the state of New York.

First race Thunder Rumble
New York Stallion Thunder Rumble Stakes is for Thoroughbred horses three-years-old and up.  The Thunder Rumble is restricted to geldings and colts at a distance of seven furlongs on the dirt and offers a purse of $75,000.

Past winners

 2010 – Driven by Success
 2009 – Uncle T Seven
 2008 – Mor Chances (Jose Lezcano)
 2007 – Stunt Man  (Javier Castellano)  (Gold and Roses, Eibar Coa up, placed)

Second race Great White Way
New York Stallion Great White Way Division (named for the famous theater district running along New York City's Broadway) is for two-year-old geldings and colts at a distance of six furlongs and offers a purse of $100,000.

The race was run at Belmont Park in 1985, 1986, 1987, and 1990.

Past winners

 2010 – Eminent Tale (Ramon A. Dominguez)
 2009 -
 2008 – Lookin At Her (Cornelio Velásquez)
 2007 – Spanky Fischbein  (John Velazquez)
 2006 – Baxter (Kent Desormeaux)
 2005 – Classic Pack (Pablo Fragoso)
 2004 – Accurate (Norberto Arroyo Jr.)
 2003 – West Virginia (Jerry D. Bailey)
 2002 – Grey Comet (José A. Santos)
 2001 – White Ibis (Robbie Davis)
 2000 – Crispy Jet (Jerry D. Bailey)
 1999 – Entrepreneur (John Velazquez)
 1998 – Shut Out Time (Joe Bravo)
 1997 – Mellow Roll (Frank Lovato Jr.)
 1996 – Say Florida Sandy (Richard Migliore)
 1995 – Romantic Rogue (Robbie Davis)
 1994 – Ave's Flag (John Velazquez)
 1993 – Spartan Victory (José A. Santos)
 1992 – Rush Chairman Bill (Randy Romero)
 1991 – Jay Gee (Ángel Cordero Jr.)
 1990 – All Smarts (Craig Perret)
 1989 – Sir Richard Lewis (Ángel Cordero Jr.)
 1988 – Scarlet Ibis (Jose Romero)
 1987 – Ballindaggin (Jorge Velásquez)
 1986 – Royal Value (Randy Romero)
 1985 – Bullet Blade (Richard Migliore)

Third race Perfect Arc

The New York Stallion Perfect Arc Division is restricted to fillies and mares three-years-old and up and run at a distance of one and one sixteenth mile on the turf for a purse of $75,000.

Past winners

 2008 – Follow My Dream (Jose Lezcano)
 2007 – Factual Contender (Eibar Coa)
 2006 – Artistic Express(3) (Cornelio Velásquez)
 2005 – Champagne Ending (3) (Pablo Fragoso)
 2004 – Kevin's Decision (4) (Edgar Prado)
 2003 – Ma Femme (5) (Julio Pezua)
 2002 – Lovely Amanda (5) (John Velazquez)
 2001 – Waku Up Kiss (3) (Edgar Prado)
 2000 – Ruby Friday (3) (Norberto Arroyo Jr.)

Fourth race Fifth Avenue
The New York Stallion Fifth Avenue Division is restricted to two year old filles, the Fifth Avenue is run at a distance of six furlongs and offers a purse of $100,000.

Fifth Avenue is a noted street in the New York City borough of Manhattan, dividing the borough's East and West sides.  It was run at Belmont Park in 1985, 1986, 1987, and 1990.

Past winners

 2008 – Sarah Accomplished (Jose Lezcano)
 2007 – Canadian Ballet (Alan Garcia)
 2006 – Laurentide Ice (Cornelio Velásquez)
 2005 – Princess Sweet (Cornelio Velásquez)
 2004 – Karakorum Splendor (Pablo Fragoso)
 2003 – So Sweet a Cat (John Velazquez)
 2002 – Beautiful America (José A. Santos)
 2001 – Princess Dixie (Edgar Prado)
 2000 – Bon Fearless (Mike Luzzi)
 1999 – Dat You Miz Blue (Jerry D. Bailey)
 1998 – Long Distance (Richard Migliore)
 1997 – Dancewiththebride (Cornelio Velásquez)
 1996 – Iamacarr (Mike Smith)
 1995 – Thunder Achiever (Jerry D. Bailey)
 1994 – Rogues Walk (John Velazquez)
 1993 – Princess JV (Richard Migliore)
 1992 – Etta (Julie Krone)
 1991 – Queen of Triumph (Jorge F. Chavez)
 1990 – Talc's Coventry (Jerry D. Bailey)
 1989 – Just Cuz (Jerry D. Bailey)
 1988 – Addy's Appeal (William Fox Jr.)
 1987 – Mithrandir (Julio Pezua)
 1986 – Lady Cave (Robbie Davis)
 1985 – Romantic Girl (Nick Santagata)

Fifth race Long Island

The Long Island Handicap is a race for Thoroughbred horses held each November at Aqueduct Racetrack. The race is for fillies and mares, age three and up, willing to race the one and one-half miles on the turf.

This race was down-graded from a Grade II event to a Grade III beginning in 2007, and carries a purse of $150,000.

Past winners

 2008 – Criticisms
 2007 – Dalvina (Cornelio Velásquez)
 2006 – Safari Queen
 2005 – Olaya
 2004 – Eleusis
 2003 – Spice Island
 2002 – Uriah
 2001 – Queue

Sixth race Staten Island
The New York Stallion Series Staten Island Stakes is for fillies and mares three-years-old and up.  The Staten Island is run at a distance of seven furlongs on the dirt and offers a purse of $75,000.

The race is named for the island that sits just below the island of Manhattan.

Past winners

 2010 – Big Brownie
 2009 – Mother Russia
 2008 – Under Serviced (John Velazquez)
 2007 – Tamberino (Eibar Coa)

Seventh race Cormorant

The New York Stallion Series Cormorant Division is for three-year-olds and up at a distance of one and one sixteenth miles on the turf and offers a purse of $75,000.

Past winners

 2009 – Ruffino (6)
 2008 – Classic Park (5) (Cornelio Velásquez)
 2007 – Red Zipper (4) (Eibar Coa)
 2006 – Red Zipper(3) (Eibar Coa)
 2005 – Retribution (3) (Cornelio Velásquez)
 2004 – Pa Pa Da (3) (Jose Espinoza)
 2003 – Quantum Merit (4) (Richard Migliore)
 2002 – Haggs Castle (4) (Mike Luzzi)
 2001 – Union One (4) (Richard Migliore)
 2000 – Chasin’ Wimmin (5) (Jean-Luc Samyn)

Eighth race Park Avenue

The New York York Stallion Series Park Avenue division (in its 18th year as of 2011) is for  three-year-old fillies at a distance of 6 furlongs and offers a purse of $100,000.

Past winners

 2011 – Lady on the Run (Mike Luzzi)
 2010 – Franny Freud (Garrett Gomez)
 2009 – Mother Russia (Ramon Domínguez) 	
 2008 – Like a Rose (Michael Luzzi) 	
 2007 – Mighty Eros (Norberto Arroyo Jr.) 	
 2006 – No Reason (Channing Hill) 	
 2005 – Pretty Suzi (Pablo Fragoso) 	
 2004 – Ihaveadate (Shaun Bridgmohan)	
 2003 – Hanselina (Edgar Prado)	
 2002 – Liveitupnow (Norberto Arroyo Jr.) 	
 2001 – Lady Katie  (Edgar Prado) 	
 2000 – Laken 	(Mike Luzzi)
 1999 – Winloc's Glorious (Shaun Bridgmohan)
 1998 – Jersey Girl (Richard Migliore) 	
 1997 – Dewars Rocks (Jorge Chavez)	
 1996 – Double Dee's (Frank Alvarado)
 1995 – Dancin Renee (Jose Velez)	
 1994 – Minetonightsfirst (Robbie Davis)

Ninth race Times Square Division

The Times Square is run at 6 furlongs and restricted to three-year-old colts and geldings.

Past winners

 2010 – General Maximus
 2009 – Uncle T Steven (Ramon Domínguez)	
 2008 – Fort Drum (Eibar Coa) 	
 2007 – Bustin Stones (Ramon Domínguez) 	
 2006 – Prince of Peace (Fernando Jara) 	
 2005 – Gold and Roses (Shaun Bridgmohan)
 2004 – West Virginia (John Velazquez)
 2003 – Grey Comet (Jerry Bailey)
 2002 – Trial Prep (John Velazquez)
 2001 – Tom's Thunder (John Velazquez)
 2000 – Be Mine Tonight (John Velazquez) 	
 1999 – Shut Out Time (Joe Bravo) 	
 1998 – Sandpile (Jorge Chavez)
 1997 – Saratoga Sunrise (Robbie Davis) 	
 1996 – Instant Friendship (John Velazquez) 	
 1995 – Ave's Flag (John Velazquez) 	
 1994 – Gash (Robbie Davis)

References

Horse races in New York (state)
Racing series for horses